"Shabba" is a song by American hip hop recording artist ASAP Ferg. It was released on July 16, 2013, as the second single from his debut studio album Trap Lord (2013). The song, produced by Snugsworth, features a guest appearance from Ferg's ASAP Mob cohort ASAP Rocky. The song's title refers to Jamaican dancehall musician Shabba Ranks, who makes a cameo appearance in the song's music video and appears on the remix. The single was certified platinum by the Recording Industry Association of America (RIAA).

Music video
On July 15, 2013, the music video for "Shabba" featuring ASAP Rocky was released. The ASAP Mob and Shabba Ranks make cameo appearances throughout the video, which was directed by Andrew Hines.

Critical reception
On December 2, 2013, Complex named "Shabba" the third best song released in 2013. They commented saying, "As the son of Trini parents growing up in Harlem, Ferg was raised around Caribbean sounds, so it's fascinating to see him pay tribute to the dancehall emperor by breaking down Shabba's essence to a mathematical equation. “Eight gold rings” x “four gold chains” x “two bad bitches” x “one gold tooth” = Shabba Ranks. Getting Shabba to appear in the song's infectiously raucous video, and later on a remix, is more than a co-sign, it's a coup de grace that elevates this sure-shot party-starter to more than just a simple shout-out. So when Ferg says “my ute don't ramp with me,” trust and believe that he knows exactly what he's talking about." Pitchfork Media ranked it at number 23 on their list of the top 100 tracks of 2013. They elaborated saying, "Ferg's rubberband flow tauntingly flossing about making raw-dogging his key to relationship trust, rocking gear like it's Mortal Kombat couture. [...] Even with all the punchlines, it's a performance driven almost entirely by charisma – factory-line machinery beats assembling a disco-lit 25-foot riser for Ferg and Rocky to ascend, their Morse code stutter-step voices slipping into a semi-patois flow so catchy it could get away with saying less than it actually does." Anthony Fantano, on his popular YouTube channel "theneedledrop", ranked the song at number 100 on his Top 100 Songs of the 2010s list.

Charts

Certifications

Release history

Remix
On November 22, 2013, the remix featuring Shabba Ranks, Busta Rhymes and Migos was released.

References

2013 singles
2013 songs
ASAP Ferg songs
ASAP Rocky songs
American hip hop songs
Songs written by ASAP Rocky
Songs written by ASAP Ferg